Activator of apoptosis harakiri is a protein that in humans is encoded by the HRK gene.

Function 

Activator of apoptosis Hrk regulates apoptosis through interaction with death-repressor proteins Bcl-2 and Bcl-X(L). The HRK protein lacks significant homology to other BCL2 family members except for an 8-amino acid region that was similar to the BCL2 homology domain-3 (BH3) motif of BIK.  HRK interacts with BCL2 and BCLXL via the BH3 domain, but not with the death-promoting BCL2-related proteins BAX, BAK, or BCLXS. HRK localizes to membranes of intracellular organelles in a pattern similar to that previously reported for BCL2 and BCLXL.

Interactions 

HRK (gene) has been shown to interact with:
 BCL2-like 1,  and
 Bcl-2.

References

Further reading